Mpigi General Hospital, also Mpigi Hospital, is a hospital in the  Central Region of Uganda.

Location
The coordinates of the hospital are:0°13'30.0"N 32°19'19.0"E (Latitude:0.225004; Longitude:32.321944).

Overview 
The hospital serves as the district hospital for Mpigi District. It has a bed capacity of 100 beds. , the hospital had one medical officer, assisted by a number of clinical officers, nurses and midwives. The major health conditions attended o included obstetric cases and complications, HIV/AIDS related morbidity, childhood fevers and respiratory infections among children and adults. The area Member of Parliament, is Amelia Kyambadde, who also serves as the Minister of Trade and Industry. She has been actively involved in the establishment of the hospital.

History
Mpigi Hospital was established in July 2012, when the existing Health Center IV was elevated to hospital status. The creation of the hospital followed lobbying by the area MP, Amelia Kyambadde. She has continued to support the new hospital by donating equipment, either directly or through her area NGO; Twezimbe Development Foundation.

See also
List of hospitals in Uganda

References

External links
 Mpigi District Information Portal
 Website of Uganda Ministry of Health

Mpigi
Mpigi District
Central Region, Uganda
2011 establishments in Uganda
Hospitals established in 2011